Mishijan-e Sofla (also Romanized as Mīshījān-e Soflá; also known as Mashijan Sofla, Mīshjān-e Pāīn, Mīshjān-e Soflá, and Mushijān Pāīn) is a village in Salehan Rural District, in the Central District of Khomeyn County, Markazi Province, Iran. At the 2006 census, its population was 265, in 76 families.

References 

Populated places in Khomeyn County